Beatrice Morse was a screenwriter of silent films in the 1910s.

Biography 
She was employed as a scenarist at World Pictures, Goldwyn Pictures, and Fox. Before making a name for herself in Hollywood, she wrote for a number of magazines.

Selected filmography 

 Humility (1918) 
 Who Knows? (1917) 
 Mrs. Matthews, Dressmaker (1912)

References 

American screenwriters
American women screenwriters